Rajinder Kumar Dhawan (16 July 1937 – 6 August 2018) was an Indian politician who was one of the leaders of the Indian National Congress and a member of the Rajya Sabha.

As personal secretary and confidant to Indian prime minister Indira Gandhi, Dhawan was a witness to Indira Gandhi assassination in 1984.  As personal assistant to the prime minister, he attained unparalleled power and influence particularly during India's Emergency. As the "door keeper" to the prime minister, he was well positioned to control information and access and proved himself instrumental in civil service appointments. He graduated from Punjab University, Chandigarh.

The head of the investigating commission, Justice Manharlal Pranlal Thakkar, described Dhawan's responses to questioning on the assassination as unreliable and said that the needle of suspicion significantly points to his complicity or involvement. However, Indira's son, Rajiv, after initially removing Dhawan from his post, cleared him of all charges.

He was jailed during the Janata Party Government in 1977 on refusal to depose against Indira Gandhi.

He served as the Minister of State (Independent Charge) in the Urban Development Ministry in the P.V. Narasimha Rao headed Congress government from September 1995 to February 1996

Dhawan died, aged 81, in Delhi on 6 August 2018.

Personal life
On 16 July 2012, R. K. Dhawan married Achla, at the age of 74.

References

Sources
Delhi Correspondent: A Confidential Agent. Economist, 25 Mar. 1989, pp. 38 & 40.
Sanjoy Hazarika; India released stinging report on Gandhi's Death. New York Times, 28 Mar. 1989.
Hewitt B: A swirl of suspicion. Newsweek, 10 April 1989, p. 17.
Barbara Crossette; Gandhi, His Luster Dimmed after 4 years, Faces Uncertain Political Future. New York Times, 22 Apr. 1989.

External links
 Congress to field Satish Sharma, Jairam Ramesh, The Hindu

1937 births
2018 deaths
Indian National Congress politicians
Rajya Sabha members from Andhra Pradesh
Rajya Sabha members from Bihar
People of the Emergency (India)
Panjab University alumni
People from Chiniot District
Union ministers of state of India with independent charge
Prisoners and detainees of India
Indian National Congress politicians from Andhra Pradesh
Indian National Congress politicians from Bihar